Crow Lake Provincial Park  is a provincial park in Alberta, Canada.

Activities
Canoeing and kayaking are available activities in the park.

See also
List of Alberta provincial parks
List of Canadian provincial parks
List of National Parks of Canada

References

External links

Lac La Biche County
Provincial parks of Alberta